Saint-André-du-Lac-Saint-Jean is a village municipality, in Le Domaine-du-Roy Regional County Municipality, in Quebec, in Canada.

Demographics 

Population trend:
 Population in 2011: 488 (2006 to 2011 population change: 0.8%)
 Population in 2006: 484
 Population in 2001: 554
 Population in 1996: 580
 Population in 1991: 606

Mother tongue:
 English as first language: 0%
 French as first language: 100%
 English and French as first language: 0%
 Other as first language: 0%

References

External links

Villages in Quebec
Incorporated places in Saguenay–Lac-Saint-Jean